Bobrovytsia, is the city in Nizhyn Raion within Chernihiv Oblast (province) of Ukraine. It sits next to the Bystrytsia. Bobrovytsia hosts the administration of Bobrovytsia urban hromada, one of the hromadas of Ukraine. Population: 

In 1614, it was a royal city of Poland however later it became a part of the Kiev Voivodeship until 1667, when it passed to Russia.

History
The ancient origins of Bobrovytsia are known from the archaeological ruins of a settlement dated from the 11th-13th centuries.

In the 16th century, Bobrovytsia was a town in the Kyiv province of the Commonwealth.

According to Polish illustrations "Bobrowica" in 1618 had about 107 homes.  According to another Polish illustration in 1628, the town was inhabited as early as the year 1600.

Until 18 July 2020, Bobrovytsia was the administrative center of Bobrovytsia Raion. The raion was abolished in July 2020 as part of the administrative reform of Ukraine, which reduced the number of raions of Chernihiv Oblast to five. The area of Bobrovytsia Raion was merged into Nizhyn Raion.

Name origins
On the origin of the name of the city Bobrovytsia there is no reliable data. There are only guesses that the settlement was called such from the beaver crafts made in the city, near the Bystritsia River to the middle of the 19th century which was called Bobrovytsia.

Demographics

Population
Population: -  Ukrainian (92%, 2001)

2.9 thousand. (1859) 
5.1 thousand. (1897)  Orthodox - 4.4 thousand., Jews - 0,7 thousand.
7.0 thousand. (1926) 
9.4 thousand. (1959)
14.5 thousand. (1988)
11.9 thousand. (2005)
11.3 thousand. (2016)

Native language distribution (2001)

References

External links
 The murder of the Jews of Bobrovytsia during World War II, at Yad Vashem website.

Cities in Chernihiv Oblast
Kozeletsky Uyezd
Cities of district significance in Ukraine
Holocaust locations in Ukraine